De Grote Donorshow (The Great Donor Show) was a reality television program which was broadcast in the Netherlands on Friday, June 1, 2007, by BNN. The program involved a supposedly terminally ill 37-year-old woman donating a kidney to one of twenty-five people requiring a kidney transplantation. After a first selection, three people remained. Viewers were able to send advice on whom they thought she should choose to give her kidney to via text messages. The profit made by the text messages was given to the Dutch Kidney Foundation. The program, due to its controversial nature, had received heavy international criticism in the run-up to the broadcast. In the end, it was revealed during the course of the show that the "terminally ill" woman was, in reality, an actress, although the three candidates were, in fact, real kidney patients; they were aware that Lisa was an actress, and participated because they were supportive of BNN's cause to give awareness to the limited number of organ donors in the Netherlands.

In a press statement after the show, Paul Römer, the director of the program's creator Endemol, stated that the show was necessary in order to get the shortage of donors back on the political agenda.

Background
Bart de Graaff, the BNN founder who died in May 2002 (almost exactly 5 years before the broadcast of the show), obtained a donor kidney in 1997. De Graaff had renal failure stemming from a car accident in his youth. The studio from which the show was aired contained photos of him, as seen in the adjacent picture. It has been claimed that De Graaff was BNN's source of inspiration for the show, both by the show's host, Lodiers, as well as in the post-broadcast press release.

Criticism and reactions

Prior to the airing of the show
Joop Atsma, a member of the House of Representatives for the Christian Democratic Appeal, had attempted to censor the show. Dutch culture minister Ronald Plasterk, citing Dutch law, refused to prohibit the television program, although he found the program to be unethical due to its competitive element. Before the show aired, the Dutch Kidney Foundation told a reporter "they welcomed all the attention the show had brought on the subject" but also stated that "their way of doing it is not ours, and it will bring no practical solution". In a press statement, the foundation also stated that they had asked BNN to cease using their logo in The Great Donor Show's logo (note the icon of a kidney instead of an "o" in the logo, as seen at the top right of the page), for which BNN had never asked permission. The Dutch prime minister, Jan Peter Balkenende, had expressed his concerns for what he believed would damage the reputation of the Netherlands.

Laurens Drillich, the chairman of BNN at the time, defended the program and argued that the network deliberately wants to shock people and draw attention to the shortage of organ donors. "We very much agree that it's bad taste but we also believe that reality is even worse taste. I mean, it's going very, very bad with organ donorship in the Netherlands. We as a broadcaster, BNN, had someone who started our TV station who needed kidneys and was on a waiting list and died eventually at the age of 35. That happened five years ago and in the last five years the situation has only gotten worse in the Netherlands."

After the airing of the show
In a press statement after the show, the director of Endemol, Paul Römer, stated "Let there be no misunderstanding, I would never make a program such as 'The Great Donor Show' for real. I do understand the massive outrage very well. But I also hope for people to understand why we did this. It was necessary to get the shortage of donors back on the political agenda. I call up everybody to get very angry about that, and to fill in a donor form."

Minister of Education, Culture, and Science Ronald Plasterk told the press he now thought that "the show had been a fantastic idea, and a great stunt". Joop Atsma, MP for the Christian Democrats, who had previously attempted to prohibit the show, has called it a "tasteless show", and claimed that he feels it didn't contribute to the solving of the problem.

A few hours after the show BNN had already received SMS messages from over 12,000 viewers who told the network that they would fill in a donor form. The day after, 30,000 donor forms were requested, and two days after the show the official Dutch TV news broadcast "NOS News" announced that 50,000 people had requested a donor form to be sent to them. In July, a month after the show aired, 7,300 new donors were registered by the Dutch donor registration.

Laurens Drillich, BNN's chairman, told the press "It was very hard to keep this a secret, and to tell this lie time after time, but I did it because of the good cause."

In 2020, thirteen years later, all three participants in the show, Vincent Moolenaar, Charlotte Trieschnigg, and Esther-Clair Sasabone, were still alive.

Dutch TV moment of the year 2007
On January 12, 2008, the scene during which Patrick Lodiers revealed that the show was a hoax with the purpose of drawing attention to the Dutch donor shortage problem was voted as the best Dutch TV moment of the year 2007. During a brief speech, the chairman of BNN, Laurens Drillich, said the following: "The show was aired in June, today is January. Dutch politicians promised to put donor shortage on their agenda. We're still waiting for a reaction."

Awards
The show won a 2008 International Emmy for non-scripted entertainment.

References

External links
 BNN.NL: De Grote Donorshow
 Full Broadcast from the Nederlandse Omroep Stichting
 

2007 Dutch television series debuts
Medical ethics
Performance hoaxes
Television series by Endemol
Dutch reality television series
2007 hoaxes
Hoaxes in the Netherlands
Television controversies in the Netherlands
International Emmy Award for Best Non-Scripted Entertainment winners
NPO 3 original programming